Shams al-Din Muhammad ibn al-Muqaddam (died at Mount Arafat on 9 February 1188) was the 1st Emir of Baalbek under Ayyubid Dynasty, Although he was not from Ayyubid origin. He was a military commander first in the service of Nur ad-Din, the Zengid ruler of Syria and Iraq, later of Saladin, the Ayyubid ruler of Egypt, Syria and Iraq.

Biography 
When Nur ad-Din died in 1174, Ibn al-Muqaddam emerged as the head of a powerful group of military commanders and high officials who wanted to assume power in Damascus. They could not prevent their rival the eunuch Gümüshtekin from assuming the guardianship for Nur ad-Din's 11-year-old son and heir, As-Salih Ismail al-Malik, and taking him to Aleppo. After Gümüshtekin made an alliance with Nur ad-Din's nephew Sayf al-Din Ghazi II of Mosul against him, he approached Saladin for assistance and allowed him to seize Damascus peacefully. Saladin awarded him with the  grant of Baalbek. When Saladin's brother, Turan-Shah, requested Baalbek from Saladin in 1179, Saladin offered Ibn al-Muqaddam to exchange Balbeek for a larger domain, but Ibn al-Muqaddam refused. Saladin besieged Baalbek and Ibn al-Muqaddam was forced to surrender it in return for Baarin, Kafartab and smaller settlements. While on the Hajj, he was wounded in the eyes during a skirmish between Syrian and Iraqi pilgrims in the tent of the Iraqi pilgrims' leader at Mount Arafat.

References

Sources

Further reading

1188 deaths
Rulers of Damascus
Incidents during the Hajj
Saladin